Stonebriar Centre, commonly referred to as Stonebriar Mall, is a mid-range shopping mall located at the intersection of Preston Road (SH 289) and the Sam Rayburn Tollway (SH 121) in Frisco, Texas, U.S. It is currently anchored by Dick's Sporting Goods, Dillard's, Forever 21, JCPenney, the first KidZania location in Texas, Macy's, Nordstrom, Barnes & Noble Booksellers, Dave & Buster's, and H&M, with one vacant anchor last being occupied by Sears. It also has a 24-screen AMC movie theater, a food court with a carousel, a Cheesecake Factory, and a Smokin' Oak Wood-Fired Pizza & Taproom which was previously a California Pizza Kitchen.

History
In 1988, Homart, then a subsidiary of Sears, planned on putting a million square foot mall in Frisco, which was a town of about 6,000 people at the time.

When Plano city officials learned of Homart's plan, they offered $10 million if the company would move its planned mall across the road into their city limits. Frisco lobbied to keep the planned mall and was able to work out tax incentives to close the deal. Plano then convinced another company, General Growth Properties, to place a mall within their city limits. In 1995, General Growth acquired Homart, who had already signed an agreement with Frisco. The City of Frisco made a final offer to General Growth of a half-cent sales tax rebate, property tax abatement for ten years, and infrastructure improvements in and around the mall. Plano continued to lobby hard for the new mall and Frisco eventually upped its sales-tax grant. Frisco finally opened the mall on August 4, 2000.

In July 2013, the ice rink at the mall, The Ice at Stonebriar, was closed.

In 2015, Sears Holdings spun off 235 of its properties, including the Sears at Stonebriar Centre, into Seritage Growth Properties.

In 2016, the mall's AMC theatre located on the upper levels was closed for three months for updating and remodeling.

In 2017, Carlo's Bake Shop opened at the mall. However, it would permanently close a few years later.

In May 2018, construction began on the 18-story Stonebriar Hyatt Hotel which would be attached to the mall. It opened to the public in June 2020. Also in May 2018, a teenager was arrested for planning to commit a mass shooting at the mall.

In 2019, Stonebriar Centre would lose one anchor but gain another. Near the end of 2018, it was announced that Sears would close as part of Sears Holdings filing for bankruptcy protection, with the liquidation of Stonebriar's location being completed by January 2019. In the fall of 2019, KidZania opened adjacent to Dillard's and the former Sears in the space previously occupying the ice rink. This was KidZania's first location to be opened in Texas.

That same year, Apple closed its store at the mall along with its location at The Shops at Willow Bend in Plano, relocating to Galleria Dallas. In November 2019, an Amazon 4-Star store and the sixth in the United States opened within the mall, but it was later closed in 2022.

California Pizza Kitchen closed its location at Stonebriar in mid-July 2020. It has since been replaced by Smokin' Oak Wood-Fired Pizza & Taproom, which opened in fall 2022.

Foiled terrorist plot
In May 2018, 17-year old Matin Azizi-Yarand was arrested at Plano West Senior High School for planning a terrorist attack on the mall. Starting from December 2017, he spoke to an undercover FBI agent posing as an ISIS member. He was held on $3 million bond. In May 2019, he was sentenced to 20 years in prison. Azizi-Yarand is currently incarcerated at Gib Lewis Unit with a scheduled release date of April 30, 2038.

Anchor tenants
The following are the anchor stores of the mall:

AMC Theatres — 
Dick's Sporting Goods — , former Galyan's store until 2004
Dillard's — , former Macy's store until 2006
Forever 21 — 
JCPenney — 
KidZania — 
Macy's — , formerly Foley's until 2006
Nordstrom — 
Barnes & Noble Booksellers — 
Dave & Buster's — 
H&M —

Former tenants
Galyan's (converted to Dick's Sporting Goods in 2004)
Foley's (May Department Stores bought out by Federated; all Foley's stores rebranded as Macy's)
 Macy's (Moved into former Foley's space) (converted to Dillard's in 2006)
Sears —  (store closed in 2019 as part of Sears Holdings' bankruptcy)

See also
List of shopping malls in the Dallas/Fort Worth Metroplex

References

External links

 Stonebriar Centre

Shopping malls in the Dallas–Fort Worth metroplex
Buildings and structures in Collin County, Texas
Brookfield Properties
Tourist attractions in Collin County, Texas
Shopping malls established in 2000